Arthur Schnitzler (15 May 1862 – 21 October 1931) was an Austrian author and dramatist.

Biography 

Arthur Schnitzler was born at Praterstrasse 16, Leopoldstadt, Vienna, capital of the Austrian Empire (as of 1867, part of the dual monarchy of Austria-Hungary). He was the son of a prominent Hungarian laryngologist, Johann Schnitzler (1835–1893), and Luise Markbreiter (1838–1911), a daughter of the Viennese doctor Philipp Markbreiter. His parents were both from Jewish families. In 1879 Schnitzler began studying medicine at the University of Vienna and in 1885 he received his doctorate of medicine. He began work at Vienna's General Hospital, but ultimately abandoned the practice of medicine in favour of writing.

On 26 August 1903, Schnitzler married Olga Gussmann (1882–1970), a 21-year-old aspiring actress and singer who came from a Jewish middle-class family. They had a son, Heinrich (1902–1982), born on 9 August 1902. In 1909 they had a daughter, Lili, who committed suicide in 1928. The Schnitzlers separated in 1921. Schnitzler died on 21 October 1931 in Vienna of a brain hemorrhage. In 1938, following the Anschluss, his son Heinrich went to the United States and did not return to Austria until 1959; he is the father of the Austrian musician and conservationist Michael Schnitzler, born in 1944 in Berkeley, California, who moved to Vienna with his parents in 1959.

Literary works
Schnitzler's works were often controversial, both for their frank description of sexuality (in a letter to Schnitzler Sigmund Freud confessed "I have gained the impression that you have learned through intuition – although actually as a result of sensitive introspection – everything that I have had to unearth by laborious work on other persons") and for their strong stand against anti-semitism, represented by works such as his play Professor Bernhardi and his novel Der Weg ins Freie. However, although Schnitzler was Jewish, Professor Bernhardi and Fräulein Else are among the few clearly identified Jewish protagonists in his work.

Schnitzler was branded as a pornographer after the release of his play Reigen, in which 10 pairs of characters are shown before and after the sexual act, leading and ending with a prostitute. The furor after this play was couched in the strongest anti-semitic terms. Reigen was made into a French language film in 1950 by the German-born director Max Ophüls as La Ronde. The film achieved considerable success in the English-speaking world, with the result that Schnitzler's play is better known there under its French title. Richard Oswald's film The Merry-Go-Round (1920), Roger Vadim's Circle of Love (1964) and Otto Schenk's Der Reigen (1973) also are based on the play. More recently, in Fernando Meirelles' film 360, Schnitzler's play was provided with a new version as has been the case with many other TV and film productions.

In the novella Fräulein Else (1924) Schnitzler may be rebutting a contentious critique of the Jewish character by Otto Weininger (1903) by positioning the sexuality of the young female Jewish protagonist. The story, a first-person stream of consciousness narrative by a young aristocratic woman, reveals a moral dilemma that ends in tragedy.

In response to an interviewer who asked Schnitzler what he thought about the critical view that his works all seemed to treat the same subjects, he replied "I write of love and death. What other subjects are there?" Despite his seriousness of purpose, Schnitzler frequently approaches the bedroom farce in his plays (and had an affair with  Adele Sandrock, one of his actresses). Professor Bernhardi, a play about a Jewish doctor who turns away a Catholic priest in order to spare a patient the realization that she is on the point of death, is his only major dramatic work without a sexual theme.

A member of the avant-garde group Young Vienna (Jung-Wien), Schnitzler toyed with formal as well as social conventions. With his 1900 novella Leutnant Gustl, he was the first to write German fiction in stream-of-consciousness narration. The story is an unflattering portrait of its protagonist and of the army's obsessive code of formal honor. It caused Schnitzler to be stripped of his commission as a reserve officer in the medical corps – something that should be seen against the rising tide of anti-semitism of the time.

He specialized in shorter works like novellas and one-act plays. And in his short stories like "The Green Tie" ("Die grüne Krawatte") he showed himself to be one of the early masters of microfiction. However he also wrote two full-length novels: Der Weg ins Freie about a talented but not very motivated young composer, a brilliant description of a segment of pre-World War I Viennese society; and the artistically less satisfactory Therese.

In addition to his plays and fiction, Schnitzler meticulously kept a diary from the age of 17 until two days before his death. The manuscript, which runs to almost 8,000 pages, is most notable for Schnitzler's casual descriptions of sexual conquests; he was often in relationships with several women at once, and for a period of some years he kept a record of every orgasm. Collections of Schnitzler's letters also have been published.

Schnitzler's works were called "Jewish filth" by Adolf Hitler and were banned by the Nazis in Austria and Germany. In 1933, when Joseph Goebbels organized book burnings in Berlin and other cities, Schnitzler's works were thrown into flames along with those of other Jews, including Einstein, Marx, Kafka, Freud and Stefan Zweig.

His novella Fräulein Else has been adapted a number of times, including the German silent film Fräulein Else (1929), starring Elisabeth Bergner, and the 1946 Argentine film The Naked Angel, starring Olga Zubarry.

Legacy 

The majority of the legacy, which consists of 40,000 pages, was saved from the Nazis, by a British man, Eric A. Blackall, who lived in Vienna at the time and acted in the name of the British embassy. The Nazi government respected that they had no access to the cellar of Schnitzler’s villa where the documents were stored. The documents were later “donated” to the Cambridge University Library. 
Olga, Schnitzler’s divorced wife, donated the documents when she had in fact no right to do so. The actual owner of the documents was Schnitzler’s son, Heinrich, who was not in Vienna at the time. 
During the Second World War and afterwards, Heinrich Schnitzler tried to get the documents back but did not succeed. Thomas Trenkler wrote in an article in the newspaper, Kurier, that the acquisition of the documents by British forces was not legitimate and that the documents should be handed to Schnitzler’s remaining family in 2015. Schnitzler’s grandsons, Michael and Peter, announced that they indeed wanted the documents handed over to them.

Selected works

Plays 
 Anatol (1893), a series of seven acts revolving around a bourgeois playboy and his immature relationships.
 Flirtation (Liebelei – 1895), also known as The Reckoning, which was made into a film by Max Ophüls in 1933, and Pierre Gaspard-Huit in 1958 (Christine), and also adapted as Dalliance by Tom Stoppard (1986) and Sweet Nothings by David Harrower for the Young Vic in 2010.
 Fair Game (Freiwild – 1896)
 Light-'O-Love (1896)
 Reigen (1897), more usually called La Ronde is still frequently presented. Max Ophüls directed the first movie adaptation of the play in 1950; Roger Vadim directed a second version in 1964, and Otto Schenk a third version in 1973. In 1998, it was reworked by British playwright David Hare as The Blue Room. It was also adapted by theatrical songwriter Michael John LaChiusa into an Off-Broadway musical called Hello Again in 1994. Suzanne Bachner did a modern adaptation called "Circle" about 21st-century sexual mores in 2002. 
 Die Gefährtin (1899)
 Paracelsus (1899)
 The Green Cockatoo (Der grüne Kakadu – 1899). Composer Richard Mohaupt adapted the play and created 1954–1956 the one-act opera Der grüne Kakadu, which premiered at the Hamburg State Opera on 16 September 1958.
 The Lonely Way (Der einsame Weg – 1904)
 Intermezzo (Zwischenspiel – 1904)
 Der Ruf des Lebens (1906)
 Countess Mizzi or the Family Reunion (Komtesse Mizzi oder Der Familientag – 1907)
 Living Hours (1911)
 Young Medardus (Der junge Medardus – 1910)
 The Vast Domain (Das weite Land – 1911). The play was adapted as Undiscovered Country by Tom Stoppard (1979). Three film versions of this play have been made, the first by Ernst Lothar in 1960 with Attila Hörbiger as Hofreiter, the second by Peter Beauvais in 1970 with O. W. Fischer, the third one in 1986 by Luc Bondy and starring Michel Piccoli.
 Professor Bernhardi (1912)
 The Comedy of Seduction (Komödie der Verführung – 1924)
 Comedies of Words and Other Plays (1917)

Novels 
 The Road into the Open (Der Weg ins Freie – 1908)
 Therese. Chronik eines Frauenlebens (1928)

Short stories and novellas 
 Dying (Sterben – 1895)
 None but the Brave (Leutnant Gustl – 1900)
 Berta Garlan (1900)
 Blind Geronimo and his Brother (Der blinde Geronimo und sein Bruder – 1902)
 The Prophecy (Die Weissagung – 1905)
 Casanova's Homecoming (Casanovas Heimfahrt – 1918)
 Fräulein Else (1924)
 Rhapsody – also published as Dream Story (Traumnovelle – 1925/26), later adapted as the film Eyes Wide Shut by American director Stanley Kubrick
 Night Games (Spiel im Morgengrauen – 1926)
 Flight into Darkness (Flucht in die Finsternis – 1931)
 The Death of a Bachelor
 Late Fame (2014)

Nonfiction 
 My Youth in Vienna (Jugend in Wien), an autobiography published posthumously in 1968
 Diary, 1879–1931

References

Further reading
 Theodor Reik, Arthur Schnitzler als Psychologe (Minden, 1913)
 H. B. Samuel, Modernities (London, 1913)
 J. G. Huneker, Ivory, Apes, and Peacocks (New York, 1915)
 Ludwig Lewisohn, The Modern Drama (New York, 1915)

External links 

 
 
 
 
 
 
 Additional works by Arthur Schnitzler (eLibrary Projekt – eLib)
 Schnitzler Archive, a research institution at the german Freiburg University which holds a copy of Schnitzler's literary estate such as drafts of his works and some unpublished works
 PushkinPress.com English editions of works by Pushkin Press

1862 births
1931 deaths
19th-century Austrian dramatists and playwrights
20th-century Austrian dramatists and playwrights
Austrian male dramatists and playwrights
Austrian medical writers
Austrian otolaryngologists
Jewish otolaryngologists
Young Vienna
Austrian Jews
Austrian people of Jewish descent
Austrian people of Hungarian-Jewish descent
Jewish dramatists and playwrights
People from Leopoldstadt
Burials at the Vienna Central Cemetery